The Alliance for Peace and Freedom (APF) is a far-right European political party founded on 4 February 2015. The main member parties had been involved in the now defunct European National Front.

The party wishes to establish a network of nationalist movements across Europe that will cooperate to strengthen their shared ideals. The party cooperates and supports other nationalist groups across Europe that are not members, these include former party member Golden Dawn, Tricolour Flame, Alternative for Sweden and the ELAM. The party is described as neo-Nazi by several newspapers, and neo-fascist by others.

The group works for "a Europe of sovereign nations in which the independent states work together on a confederated basis", and for the perennity and the safeguarding of the "ancestral" European traditions such as the Christian tradition.

Europa Terra Nostra
The Europa Terra Nostra is the official European political foundation of the APF. The ETN was founded 3 July 2015 in Berlin where it continues to operate as the official think-tank of the APF and serves as the European framework for national foundations/think-tanks recognised by APF member-parties.

International connections
The APF works to co-ordinate European nationalist parties across the continent. It helped establish the Italy for the Italians coalition composed of APF member New Force along with Tricolour Flame. In 2017 the APF aided in the formation of the National Identity Bloc in Europe coalition, APF members, United Romania Party and Noua Dreaptă joined forces with the Greater Romania Party. In 2019 The APF played a part in forming the ADÑ Identidad Española coalition, composed of APF member National Democracy, FE-JONS, Spanish Alternative and La Falange.

The party also maintains contacts with the former leader of the National Rally, Jean-Marie Le Pen, who was expelled from his party in 2015. He joined the group in March 2018.

The APF maintains contacts with conservative circles in Russia with the group being invited to conferences hosted by the Kremlin. The party supports Vladimir Putin and United Russia's leadership of Russia, especially in the Russo-Ukrainian War and Syrian Civil War. The party is supportive of Alexander Lukashenko and maintains contacts with the Liberal Democratic Party of Belarus.

The APF strongly supports Serbian nationalists and is opposed to international recognition of Kosovo, it has worked in the past with the Serbian Radical Party. On 26 September 2021, the APF held a conference in Belgrade hosted by the Serbian Right.

It maintains friendly relations with the Syrian Arab Socialist Ba'ath Party government with Deputy chairman, Nick Griffin being invited to Syria by Bashar al-Assad multiple times as an ambassador. Meetings between the party and the Syrian Social Nationalist Party have been held with the AFP publicly supporting the SSNP. The group maintains contacts with Hezbollah and has hosted at least one meeting with Hezbollah leaders. The group has been in regular contact with Lebanese leader Michel Aoun and the ruling Free Patriotic Movement.

Member parties

Former member parties

Executive Board

MEPs 
Eighth European Parliament:

Ninth European Parliament:

See also 
 Alliance of European National Movements
 Euronat
 European National Front (2004–2009)

References

Notes

External links 
 Alliance for Peace and Freedom – APF official website

Nationalist organizations
Pan-European political parties
2015 establishments in the European Union
Political parties established in 2015
Neo-fascist parties
Neo-Nazism in Europe
Far-right political parties
Far-right politics in Europe